The Tumen River Bridge is a bridge over the Tumen River, connecting Hunchun City, Jilin Province, China, with Sonbong County, Rason, North Korea. It is located at Quanhedao where the Quan River meets the Tumen River.

In February 1997, tourist access across the bridge was allowed. A new bridge over the Tumen River is currently in the planning stage.

See also
 Sino–Korean Friendship Bridge and New Yalu River Bridge (Dandong City)
 Ji'an Yalu River Border Railway Bridge
 Changbai-Hyesan International Bridge
 Linjiang Yalu River Bridge
 Tumen Border Bridge (Tumen City)

References

International bridges
Bridges in North Korea
Buildings and structures in North Hamgyong Province
Bridges in China
Buildings and structures in Jilin
Transport in Jilin
China–North Korea border crossings
Bridges completed in 1938
1938 establishments in China
1938 establishments in Korea